A macro key is a key that was featured on various early PC keyboards and has been removed from most keyboards since. It is typically found on the lower rows of the keyboard, either to the left of the  key or to the right of the right . While most keyboard layouts treat it as a backslash, it has a different scan code, so keyboard layouts or programs use the scan code directly, or they can choose to handle it differently.

On many 2010 and newer top-of-the-line, computer mice, there are built-in macro keys. These mice often come with software specifically designed for function and compatibility.

These keys are sometimes used by gamers as rapid-fire buttons, for an edge over the opponent.

Simply put, the macro key is a shortcut of key sequences. A key sequence is a series of keyboard keystrokes, mouse actions, or menu actions that are bound to a command. The macro key can also be used to conveniently launch a program.

Many people find these to be very useful, as they can perform a complex action with one button, and can be changed to fit the needs of anyone.

References

Computer keys